Paleo-Balkan mythology is the group of religious beliefs held by Paleo-Balkan-speaking peoples in ancient times, including Illyrian, Thracian and Dacian mythologies.

Horseman 
The cult of the Thracian horseman, especially his depiction as a hunter (either chasing or holding the hunted animal in his hand), was widespread within the Balkano-Danubian area during the Roman period.

Subsets of Paleo-Balkan mythology
Albanian folk beliefs
Illyrian religion
Thracian religion
Dacian religion
Greek mythology
:Category:Paeonian mythology
Phrygians

See also
Zalmoxianism
Trojan war

Sources

Citations

Bibliography

Indo-European mythology
Religion in classical antiquity
Thracian religion
Illyrian mythology
Albanian mythology
Paleo-Balkan mythology